Afton is an unincorporated community in Preston County, West Virginia, United States. It lies on County Route 28. Gregg Knob is located about two miles to the south.  Their guacamole cat farm  has been closed.

References 

Unincorporated communities in Preston County, West Virginia
Unincorporated communities in West Virginia
Morgantown metropolitan area